The Wangaratta Rovers, officially known as the Wangaratta Rovers Football & Netball Club, is an Australian rules football club based in Wangaratta, Victoria and play in the Ovens & Murray Football League. Their nickname is the Hawks. Their home ground is W.J. Findlay Oval in Wangaratta. Their playing guernsey consists of gold and brown stripes on the front and gold on the back.

History

Wangaratta Rovers were initially formed in 1923 and competed in the Ovens and King Football League (O&KFL) from 1923 to 1929. They merged with the Wangaratta Football Club in 1930, who then entered one team in the Ovens and Murray Football League and one team in the O&KFL.

The Wangaratta Rovers re-formed in 1945 and competed in the O&KFL from 1945 to 1949, winning the 1948 premiership and losing to Myrtleford in the 1949 O&KFL grand final, before joining the Ovens & Murray Football League in 1950.

Football Premierships
Seniors
Ovens and King Football League (1)
1948
Ovens and Murray Football League (15)
1958, 1960, 1964, 1965, 1971, 1972, 1974, 1975, 1977, 1978, 1979, 1988, 1991, 1993, 1994.

Reserves
Ovens and Murray Football League (8)
1958, 1962, 1976, 1977, 1980, 1983, 1984, 2007.

Under 18 / Thirds
Ovens and Murray Football League (11)
1980, 1985, 1988, 1995, 1996, 1998, 1999, 2002, 2003, 2008, 2018.

Netball Premiership
A. Grade
Ovens and Murray Football League (4)
1993, 1994, 2005, 2006, 
B. Grade
Ovens and Murray Football League (1)
1999
C. Grade
Ovens and Murray Football League (1)
1996, 
16 & Under
Ovens and Murray Football League (1)
2019

VFL / AFL Players
The following footballers played with Wangaratta Rovers, prior to playing senior football in the VFL/AFL, and / or drafted, with the year indicating their VFL/AFL debut.

1929 - Gil Patrick - Footscray
1950 - Mac Hill - Collingwood
1956 - Alan Dale - St. Kilda
1959 - Kevin Dellar - Essendon
1959 - Les Gregory - St. Kilda
1964 - Barrie Beattie - Footscray
1964 - Graeme Leydin - Essendon
1967 - Mike Hallahan - Fitzroy
1968 - Norm Bussell - Hawthorn
1972 - Phil Doherty - North Melbourne
1973 - Mick Nolan - North Melbourne
1975 - John Byrne - North Melbourne
1985 - Rohan Robertson - North Melbourne
1985 - Shane Robertson - North Melbourne
1987 - Paul Bryce - North Melbourne
1987 - Craig Patrick - North Melbourne, Pick No.35
1988 - Scott Williamson - West Coast Eagles, Pick No.44
1989 - Joe Wilson - Brisbane Bears, Pick No.51
1990 - Tim Rieniets - Carlton
1990 - Robert Hickmott - Melbourne
1990 - Scott Williamson - Melbourne, No. 31 (1990 Pre season draft)
1991 - Dean Harding - Fitzroy
2001 - Andrew Hill - Collingwood, No.39 (2001 AFL Rookie Draft)
2002 - Sean O'Keeffe - Carlton
2003 - Karl Norman - Carlton
2004 - Luke Mullins - St. Kilda
2006 - Alipate Carlile - Port Adelaide
2007 - Ben Reid - Collingwood
2010 - Sam Reid - Sydney Swans
2014 - Zac O'Brien - Brisbane Lions
2021 - Nick Murray - Adelaide Crows

The following footballers played senior VFL / AFL football prior to playing and / or coaching with Wangaratta Rovers with the year indicating their first season at WRFNC.

1950 - Ken Bodger - Hawthorn
1954 - Alan Dale - St. Kilda
1956 - Bob Rose - Collingwood
1962 - Graeme Leydin - Essendon
1964 - Ken Boyd - South Melbourne
1964 - Frank Hogan - South Melbourne
1965 - Bob Hempel - Footscray
1967 - Ian Brewer - Collingwood
1975 - Andrew Scott - Hawthorn
1981 - Phil Seaton - Melbourne
1983 - Gerry McCarthy - Hawthorn & Fitzroy
1987 - Peter Tossol - Melbourne
2001 - Nick Trask - Brisbane Bears
2012 - Barry Hall - St. Kilda, Sydney Swans & Footscray
2014 - Daniel Archer - St. Kilda
2014 - Jarrad Boumann - Hawthorn
2014 - James Mulligan - Footscray
2019 - Daryn Cresswell - Sydney Swans
2021 - Matt Jones - Melbourne
2021 - Sam Murray - Collingwood

External links

WRFNC - Website
WRFNC - Facebook

Australian rules football clubs in Victoria (Australia)
Ovens & Murray Football League clubs
Sport in Wangaratta